Mount Zion is an unincorporated community in Jackson Township, Wells County, in the U.S. state of Indiana.

History
A post office was established at Mount Zion in 1873, and remained in operation until it was discontinued in 1917. The community took its name from the nearby Mount Zion Church.

Geography

References

Unincorporated communities in Wells County, Indiana
Unincorporated communities in Indiana
Fort Wayne, IN Metropolitan Statistical Area